Srimara is a genus of wrinkled bark beetles in the family Carabidae. Srimara planicollis, found in Vietnam, is the only species of this genus.

References

Rhysodinae